Mark John Lowrey (born 13 September 1971) is a former English cricketer.  Lowrey was a right-handed batsman who bowled right-arm off break.  He was born in Hampstead, London and later educated at Radley College and Cambridge University.

Lowrey made his first-class debut for Cambridge University against Northamptonshire in 1990.  From 1990 to 1991, he represented the University in 20 first-class matches, the last of which came against Oxford University.  In his 20 first-class matches for the University, he scored 597 runs at a batting average of 19.90, with 3 half centuries and a high score of 72.  In the field he took 3 catches.  With the ball he took 19 wickets at a bowling average of 51.52, with best figures of 3/31.

In 1999, he represented the Middlesex Cricket Board in a single List A match against Cumberland in the 1999 NatWest Trophy.  In his only List A match, he scored 24 runs and with the ball he took a single wicket at a cost of 38 runs.

References

External links
Mark Lowrey at Cricinfo
Mark Lowrey at CricketArchive

1971 births
Living people
People from Hampstead
Cricketers from Greater London
People educated at Radley College
Alumni of the University of Cambridge
English cricketers
Cambridge University cricketers
Middlesex Cricket Board cricketers